Abraham Bass Flores (born 9 August 2001) is a Mexican professional footballer who plays as a defensive midfielder.

Career statistics

Club

References

External links
 
 
 

Living people
2001 births
Association football midfielders
Atlas F.C. footballers
Liga de Expansión MX players
Liga MX players
Tampico Madero F.C. footballers
Footballers from Mexico City
Mexican footballers